Amedeo Bagnis (born 11 November 1999) is an Italian skeleton racer who competed at the 2022 Winter Olympics in Beijing.He lives in Tricerro between Milano and Torino. At the IBSF Junior World Championships 2022 in Innsbruck he won the skeleton bronze medal.

References

External links

1999 births
Italian male skeleton racers
Living people
People from Vercelli
Olympic skeleton racers of Italy
Sportspeople from the Province of Vercelli
Skeleton racers at the 2022 Winter Olympics
21st-century Italian people